Norberto Doroteo Méndez (January 5, 1923 – June 22, 1998), nicknamed Tucho, was an Argentine footballer who played as a  midfielder. Internationally, he played 33 games for the Argentina national team and won 3 Copa América titles. He is most famous for being the all-time top scorer in the history of the tournament with 17 goals.

In domestic football, Méndez's most notable tenures were on Huracán (where he won three National cups) and Racing, winning three Primera División championships.

Club career
He was born on January 5, 1923, in the city of Buenos Aires. Méndez started his playing career with Huracán in 1941. In 1947 he moved to Racing Club where he helped the team win three consecutive Primera División titles in 1949, 1950 and 1951. In 1954 Méndez moved to Tigre, he returned to Huracán in 1956 and he retired from football in 1958 at the age of 35.

Méndez once said that he had three great loves in his life: Huracán was his girlfriend, Racing his wife and the Argentina national team his passion.

International career
Méndez played for the Argentina national team between 1945 and 1956, he played 31 games and scored 19 goals. He is the equal 10th highest scoring player in the history of Argentine football.

Méndez helped Argentina to win three Copa América titles, he scored 17 goals in the competition, making him the highest scoring player in the history of the tournament.

Honours

Club
Huracán
Copa Adrián C. Escobar (2): 1942, 1943
Copa de Competencia Británica (1): 1944

Racing Club
Primera División (3): 1949, 1950, 1951

International
Argentina
Copa América (3): 1945, 1946, 1947
Copa Lipton (1): 1945
Copa Newton (1): 1945

Individual
Copa América all-time top scorer: 17 goals
Copa América Golden Boot: 1945
Copa América Silver Boot: 1946, 1947

References

External links

 Clarín Tucho Méndez obituary
 

1923 births
1998 deaths
Footballers from Buenos Aires
Argentine footballers
Association football forwards
Argentina international footballers
Club Atlético Huracán footballers
Racing Club de Avellaneda footballers
Club Atlético Tigre footballers
Burials at La Chacarita Cemetery
Copa América-winning players